Carnival Figures (Spanish:Gigantes y cabezudos) is a 1926 Spanish silent film directed by Florián Rey.

Cast
 Manuel Alares 
 Miguel Fleta]
 Flores Galán
 José María Jimeno
 Braulio Lausín 'Gitanillo de Ricla' as Bullfighter  
 Francisco Martí
 Antonio Mata
 Guillermo Muñoz
 José Nieto 
 Agripina Ortega
 Marina Torres 
 Luis Vela]
 Telmo Vela
 Carmen Viance

References

Bibliography
  Eva Woods Peiró. White Gypsies: Race and Stardom in Spanish Musical Films. U of Minnesota Press, 2012.

External links

1926 films
Spanish silent films
Films directed by Florián Rey
Spanish black-and-white films